Vera Mikhailovna Inber, born Shpenzer (10 July 1890, Odessa11 November 1972, Moscow), was a Russian and Soviet poet and writer.

Biography
Her father Moshe owned a scientific publishing house "Matematika" ("Mathematics"). Moshe was cousin to the future socialist revolutionary Leon Trotsky. The nine-year-old Lev (Trotsky) lived with Moshe and his wife Fanni in their Odesa apartment when Vera was a baby.

Inber briefly attended a History and Philology department in Odessa. Her first poems were published in 1910 in local newspapers. In 1910–1914, she lived in Paris and Switzerland; then she moved to Moscow. During the 1920s, Inber worked as a journalist, writing prose, articles, and essays, and traveling across the country and abroad.

During World War II, she lived in besieged Leningrad where her husband worked as the director at a medical institute. According to her The New York Times obituary, she "wrote for the newspaper Leningradskaya Pravda and broadcast over Leningrad radio in efforts to keep up the morale and spirit of the hard‐pressed population." Much of her poetry and prose during those times is dedicated to the life and resistance of Soviet citizens.

Inber translated into Russian such foreign poets as Paul Éluard and Sándor Petőfi, as well as Ukrainian poets Taras Shevchenko and Maksym Rylsky. She dabbled in cabbala, although it had been forbidden by her elders.

Awards
In 1946, she received the Stalin Prize for her siege-time poem Pulkovo Meridian. She was also awarded several medals.

English translations
Maya, from Such a Simple Thing and Other Stories, FLPH, Moscow, 1959. from Archive.org
The Death of Luna, from Soviet Short Stories: A Penguin Parallel Text, Penguin, 1963.
Leningrad Diary, Hutchinson, UK, 1971.
Lalla's Interests, from Russian Short Stories from Pushkin to Buida, Penguin Classics, 2005.

References

1890 births
1972 deaths
20th-century Russian journalists
20th-century Russian short story writers
20th-century Russian translators
20th-century Russian women writers
People from Odessky Uyezd
Women poets from the Russian Empire
Writers from Odesa
Communist Party of the Soviet Union members
Stalin Prize winners
Recipients of the Order of the Red Banner of Labour
Jewish poets
Odesa Jews
Socialist realism writers
Russian women journalists
Russian women poets
Russian women short story writers
Soviet journalists
Soviet short story writers
Soviet women poets
Ukrainian–Russian translators
Burials at Vvedenskoye Cemetery